Dağdelen is a Turkish given name for males and a surname. Notable people with the surname include:

 Sevim Dağdelen, German politician
 Uğur Dağdelen, Turkish footballer
 Aydın Dağdelen, retired Turkish goalkeeper

Turkish-language surnames